Olena Viktorivna Starikova (born 22 April 1996) is a Ukrainian track cyclist. She represented her nation at the 2014 and 2015 UCI Track Cycling World Championships.

Career results

2014
Grand Prix Galichyna
1st Keirin
1st Team Sprint (with Olena Tsyos)
2nd Sprint
2nd 500m Time Trial
3rd Sprint, Grand Prix of Poland (U23)
2015
Grand Prix Galichyna
1st 500m Time Trial
2nd Sprint
3rd Keirin
2nd Team Sprint, Grand Prix of Poland (with Lyubov Basova)
3rd Team Sprint, Grand Prix Minsk (with Lyubov Basova)
3rd Team Sprint, Memorial of Alexander Lesnikov (with Lyubov Basova)
2016
Grand Prix Galichyna
1st Keirin
1st Sprint
1st 500m Time Trial
3rd Sprint, Prilba Moravy
2021
4th Keirin, Olympic Games
2nd  Sprint

References

External links

1996 births
Ukrainian female cyclists
Ukrainian track cyclists
Living people
Cyclists at the 2019 European Games
European Games medalists in cycling
European Games silver medalists for Ukraine
Olympic cyclists of Ukraine
Cyclists at the 2020 Summer Olympics
Medalists at the 2020 Summer Olympics
Olympic medalists in cycling
Olympic silver medalists for Ukraine
Sportspeople from Kharkiv